One third of Basingstoke and Deane Borough Council in Hampshire, England is elected each year, followed by one year without election. Since the last boundary changes in 2021, 54 councillors have been elected from 18 wards.

Political history

Political control
Since the foundation of the council in 1973 political control of the council has been held by the following parties:

Leadership
The leaders of the council since 2008 have been:

Council composition
The council composition is currently as follows:
|

Council elections
1973 Basingstoke District Council election
1976 Basingstoke District Council election (New ward boundaries)
1979 Basingstoke and Deane Borough Council election
1980 Basingstoke and Deane Borough Council election
1982 Basingstoke and Deane Borough Council election
1983 Basingstoke and Deane Borough Council election
1984 Basingstoke and Deane Borough Council election
1986 Basingstoke and Deane Borough Council election (Borough boundary changes took place but the number of seats remained the same)
1987 Basingstoke and Deane Borough Council election
1988 Basingstoke and Deane Borough Council election
1990 Basingstoke and Deane Borough Council election
1991 Basingstoke and Deane Borough Council election (Borough boundary changes took place but the number of seats remained the same)
1992 Basingstoke and Deane Borough Council election (New ward boundaries)
1994 Basingstoke and Deane Borough Council election
1995 Basingstoke and Deane Borough Council election
1996 Basingstoke and Deane Borough Council election
1998 Basingstoke and Deane Borough Council election
1999 Basingstoke and Deane Borough Council election
2000 Basingstoke and Deane Borough Council election
2002 Basingstoke and Deane Borough Council election (New ward boundaries increased the number of seats by 3)
2003 Basingstoke and Deane Borough Council election
2004 Basingstoke and Deane Borough Council election
2006 Basingstoke and Deane Borough Council election
2007 Basingstoke and Deane Borough Council election
2008 Basingstoke and Deane Borough Council election (New ward boundaries)
2010 Basingstoke and Deane Borough Council election
2011 Basingstoke and Deane Borough Council election
2012 Basingstoke and Deane Borough Council election
2014 Basingstoke and Deane Borough Council election
2015 Basingstoke and Deane Borough Council election
2016 Basingstoke and Deane Borough Council election
2018 Basingstoke and Deane Borough Council election
2019 Basingstoke and Deane Borough Council election
2021 Basingstoke and Deane Borough Council election

Borough result maps

By-election results

1993-1997

1997-2001

2001-2005

2005-2009

2009-2013

2013-present

References

By-election results

External links
Basingstoke and Deane Borough Council

 
Politics of Basingstoke and Deane
Council elections in Hampshire
District council elections in England